Johnny and the Moon is a Canadian indie rock band based in Shawnigan Lake, British Columbia. The band is fronted by Dante DeCaro of Hot Hot Heat and Wolf Parade and also includes Lindy Gerrard, Mark Devoe, and Jeff "Big Juicy Papa" Phillips.

History
Johnny and the Moon was formed in 2006.   The band's name is a play on the 1959 band Johnny and the Moondogs, the precursor to Beatles.

The band released its self-titled debut album in 2006 on British Columbia, Canada based label Kill Devil Hills Records.

The band continued to perform on the west coast and in northern Canada for several years after the album's release, including an appearance at the Dawson City Music Festival in 2010. Reviews of their live shows were mixed.

Members

Current
Dante DeCaro: Vocals, guitar, banjo (2006–present)
Mark Devoe: Bass, Keyboards (2006–present)
Lindy Gerrard: Percussion (2006–present)
Jeff "Big Juicy Papa" Phillips: Saxophone (2006–present)

Discography
 Johnny and the Moon (2006)

See also

Music of Canada
Canadian rock
List of Canadian musicians
List of bands from Canada
List of bands from British Columbia

References

External links
 Johnny and the Moon on Myspace
 Kill Devil Hills Records

Musical groups established in 2006
Canadian folk rock groups
Canadian indie rock groups
Musical groups from British Columbia
2006 establishments in British Columbia
Canadian indie folk groups